Atemnora is a monotypic moth genus in the family Sphingidae erected by Walter Rothschild and Karl Jordan in 1903. Its only species, Atemnora westermannii, described by Jean Baptiste Boisduval in 1875, is known from wooded habitats throughout the Ethiopian Region including Madagascar, but excluding the extreme south of Africa.

The length of the forewings is 23–31 mm.

References

Macroglossini
Monotypic moth genera
Taxa named by Walter Rothschild
Moths of Africa
Moths of Madagascar
Taxa named by Karl Jordan